American Stonehenge is a folk album released in 1978 by Robin Williamson and his Merry Band.  This album was produced by Robin Williamson and engineered by Dirk Dalton at Dirk Dalton Recording, Santa Monica, California, in December 1977.

The 2006 CD re-release by Gott Discs includes as a bonus the poetry piece "Song of Mabon" from a 1982 Poetry London magazine cover flexidisk.

Track listing 
All songs were written by Robin Williamson except "Zoo Blues" by Robin Williamson / Sylvia Woods / Christopher Caswell / Jerry McMillan.

 "Port London Early"
 "Pacheco"
 "Keepsake"
 "Zoo Blues"
 "These Islands Green"
 "The Man In The Van"
 "Sands And The Glass"
 "Her Scattered Gold"
 "When Evening Shadows Fall"
 "Rab's Last Woolen Testament"

Personnel 
 Robin Williamson - vocal, guitar, percussion, alto flute, hunting horn, swanee whistle, Jews harp, mandolin, mandocello, Glenlivet bottle
 Sylvia Woods - Celtic harp, glockenspiel, harpsichord, kazoo, vocal
 Chris Caswell - flute, metal-strung harp, accordion, jug, cheeks, animal noises, whistle, bagpipes, bodhran, vocal
 Jerry McMillan - violin, piano, viola, animal noises, vocal

with

 Pete Grant - six-string and ten-string dobro
 Dirk Dalton - bass guitar
 Stu Brotman - bowed bass
 Louis Killen - concertina

References 

1978 albums
Robin Williamson albums